HPTE, also known as hydroxychlor, p,p'-hydroxy-DDT, or 2,2-bis(4-hydroxyphenyl)-1,1,1-trichloroethane, is a metabolite of methoxychlor, a synthetic insecticide related to DDT. Like bisphenol A with similar chemical structure, HPTE is an endocrine disruptor which has estrogenic activity, and also inhibits Cholesterol side-chain cleavage enzyme (P450scc, CYP11A1) and 3α-hydroxysteroid dehydrogenase (3α-HSD).

References

3α-Hydroxysteroid dehydrogenase inhibitors
Cholesterol side-chain cleavage enzyme inhibitors
Endocrine disruptors
Bis(4-hydroxyphenyl)methanes
Trichloromethyl compounds
Xenoestrogens